Paolo Diego Bubbio (born 18 May 1974) is an Italian philosopher and Associate Professor of Philosophy at Western Sydney University. He is known for his research on post-Kantian philosophy, philosophical hermeneutics and philosophy of religion (in particular the notion of sacrifice). He is the editor of the "Contemporary Studies in Idealism" book series for Lexington Books.

Career
Bubbio was born in Turin, Piedmont. He studied philosophy at the University of Turin, where he attended the lectures of Gianni Vattimo and graduated with a Laurea Magistrale in 1997, with a thesis on René Girard and the philosophy of religion. 
He then obtained a doctorate in philosophical hermeneutics from the University of Turin in 2003, with a dissertation on the notion of sacrifice in contemporary philosophy.
After his PhD, Bubbio worked as assegnista di ricerca (contract researcher) and as professore a contratto (adjunct professor) at the University of Turin.
In 2003/2004, he was Research Fellow at Heythrop College (University of London), where he met René Girard, with whom he had a correspondence since 1997. In 2006, he moved to Australia, where he worked at The University of Sydney, first as University of Sydney Postdoctoral Fellow (2006-2009) and then as Australian Postdoctoral Fellow on an ARC-funded research project (with Paul Redding) on “The God of Hegel’s Post-Kantian Idealism” (2009-2012). From 2009 to 2011, he was co-director (with Paul Redding) of the “Religion and Post-Kantian Philosophy Research Cluster” at The University of Sydney.  In 2011 he received an ARC Future Fellowship on a project entitled “The Quest for the I: Reaching a Better Understanding of the Self through Hegel and Heidegger” and joined the School of Humanities and Communication Arts at Western Sydney University, first as senior lecturer in philosophy and then as associate professor in philosophy.

Philosophy

Sacrifice and Perspectivism
Bubbio focuses on the notion of sacrifice and on the philosophical tradition of perspectivism, which he sees as inter-related. Building on his doctoral research, he wrote a series of articles centred on the distinction between two different meanings of “sacrifice”: sacrifice as “suppression” or “investment” (to give something up in order to get something back in exchange), and sacrifice as “withdrawal” or “relinquishment” – the latter also referred to as “kenotic sacrifice”, as it is representatively modelled on Christ’s act of renouncing his divine nature in the incarnation to become human. In Sacrifice in the Post-Kantian Tradition: Perspectivism, Intersubjectivity, and Recognition, Bubbio argues that kenotic sacrifice is the driving force (both historical and theoretical) of the tradition of perspectivism, considered as the tenet that no way of seeing the world can be taken as definitely true (and thus distinct from relativism, considered as the tenet that all perspectives are equally valid). Bubbio therefore analyses key thinkers in the Kantian and post-Kantian tradition (Kant, Solger, Hegel, Kierkegaard, and Nietzsche), and concludes that kenotic sacrifice is the move according to which one “withdraws” and relinquishes her pretension to absolute objectivity, in order to “make room” for other points of view – thus paving the way for the overcoming of the old metaphysical ideal of the “absolutely objective” point of view (or “God’s-eye view”). 
In this context, Hegel is regarded as playing a key role: Bubbio sees in Hegel’s philosophy an accomplished form of perspectivism, one that avoids the problems of more “extreme” forms of perspectivism, such as Nietzsche’s.

Hegel, God and the Self
Hegel’s philosophy, and specifically Hegel’s conception of God and the self (that Bubbio sees as inter-related), is the subject of Bubbio’s 2017 book God and the Self in Hegel: Beyond Subjectivism. In this book, Bubbio endorses a “qualified revisionist interpretation” of Hegel. The term “qualified revisionist” was coined by Paul Redding to refer to Beatrice Longuenesse’s tenets that Hegel’s metaphysics is “an investigation of the universal determinations of thought at work in any attempt to think what is” and that “metaphysics after Kant is a science of being as being thought”. Bubbio, however, introduces a further qualification: an interpretation of the objective reality that Hegel wants for metaphysical objects (including religious ideas, such as the idea of God) as mediated objectivity, to refer to “an objectivity that does not reflect the reality of an object distinct from and opposed to human consciousness, but an objectivity that takes into account the contribution of our self-conscious mind for the establishment of the content of that metaphysical object and thus reflects the relational unity between subject and object”. The same idea is expressed by Bubbio’s iconic phrase that “our gaze is always already part of reality, and reality is such because it includes our gaze”. Translated on a religious level, Bubbio advocates for a figural interpretation of religious notions in Hegel’s philosophy and he argues that, in Hegel’s view, “subjectivism can be avoided, and content can be restored to religion, only to the extent that God is understood in God’s relation to human beings and human beings are understood in their relation to God”. This explains, according to Bubbio, why for Hegel self-knowledge and knowledge of God are mutually dependent – because this knowledge “is possible only in the context of an epistemological openness (perspectivism) and practical openness (recognition)”. Bubbio takes this to be “Hegel’s fundamental speculative intuition”. Hegel is therefore seen as providing an answer to the challenge of how to conceive the mind-world relation without setting mind over and against the world and as a way of overcoming subjectivism in both philosophy and religion. Also, in this way Bubbio connects his work on Hegel with his previous work on sacrifice, considered both in its epistemological and practical implications.

God and the Self in Hegel received significant attention in the field of Hegel scholarship, re-igniting a debate about the status of the idea of God in Hegel’s philosophy. Some scholars welcomed Bubbio’s move enthusiastically: Cyril O’Regan wrote that “God and the Self in Hegel makes essential contributions to the understanding of Hegel’s philosophical thought” covering topics such as Hegel’s famous ‘death of God’ trope “extraordinarily well”, and Philip T. Grier called it “an impressive and also challenging examination of Hegel’s philosophy of religion”. Other scholars, while acknowledging the value of Bubbio’s reconstruction, were more critical about its outcome, precisely insofar as it advocates for the centrality of the idea of God in Hegel’s philosophy.

In a series of articles, Bubbio has further elaborated on the idea of the “I”, which he had already addressed in God and the Self in Hegel, advancing the idea that contemporary philosophy needs to rethink the notion of the “I” to face contemporary challenges, and advocating for “a more flexible model of the ‘I,’ a model that avoids individualism, allows thinking of the formation of the self as a collective enterprise, and thus provides each one of us with the conceptual resources to transform our identity without losing it”. Bubbio argues that the resources for such a philosophical enterprise can be retrieved in the thoughts of Hegel and Heidegger, which he sees as complementing each other.

Mimetic theory
Bubbio has also written extensively on Rene Girard’s mimetic theory. His book Intellectual Sacrifice and Other Mimetic Paradoxes collects his most significant writings on the topic, and is presented as Bubbio’s intellectual journey over two decades (from 1999 to 2019) through mimetic theory. The first part is a revised translation of a short book originally published in Italian in 1999: the central thesis here is that philosophy and religion can be regarded as subjects involved in a mimetic rivalry on the intellectual level. In the chapters of the second part of the book, Bubbio addresses several topics developing the dialogue between Girard’s mimetic theory and the Post-Kantian philosophical tradition, and in particular contemporary philosophical hermeneutics. In the final chapter, Bubbio advocates for the need of developing mimetic theory into Hermeneutic Mimetic Theory (or HMT). According to Bubbio, HMT can solve some of the internal problems of mimetic theory in its original version, and at the same time it can offer a meaningful contribution to the development of a new paradigm of the “I”.

Bibliography
 
 
 
 Bubbio, D. and Redding, P. (2012), Religion After Kant. God and Culture in the Idealist Era, Cambridge Scholars Publishing .
 Bubbio, D. and Quadrio, P. (2011), The Relationship of Philosophy to Religion Today, Cambridge Scholars Publishing 
 Luigi Pareyson, Existence, Interpretation, Freedom (Selected Writings), Edited (with introduction) by Diego Bubbio, Davies Group Publishers, 2009
 Bubbio, D. (2004), Il Sacrificio. La Ragione e il suo Altrove [Sacrifice. Reason and its Other], Citta Nuova 8831101404
 Bubbio, P. (1999), Il Sacrificio Intellettuale: Rene Girard e la Filosofia della Religione, Il Quadrante Edizioni

See also
Italian philosophy

References

External links
 Diego Bubbio at Western Sydney University
 Paolo Diego Bubbio: "Mimetic Theory and Hermeneutics" in Colloquy 9 (2005). Accessed 26 February 2013
 The quest for the “I”, Diego Bubbio, New Philosopher, April 10, 2014
 , Keynote Lecture, Kingston University, April 15, 2016
Kant’s Sacrificial Turns – Talk at Western Sydney University, October 24, 2012

Living people
21st-century Italian philosophers
Philosophers of nihilism
Philosophers of religion
Continental philosophers
University of Turin alumni
Academic staff of Western Sydney University
Hermeneutists
Heidegger scholars
Hegel scholars
Nietzsche scholars
1974 births
Kierkegaard scholars
Italian–English translators
Writers from Turin